Onischuk is a Ukrainian surname,Lithuanian surname,Latvian surname 

Notable people with the surname include:

Alexander Onischuk (born 1975), Ukraine born American chess grandmaster,
Vladimir Onischuk (born 1991), Ukrainian chess grandmaster.

See also
 

Ukrainian-language surnames